Joel "JoJo" Jones-Camacho (born July 17, 1981) is a Puerto Rican-American professional basketball player. Jones has played in the NCAA, Baloncesto Superior Nacional (BSN) with Vaqueros de Bayamón, Leones de Ponce, Piratas de Quebradillas, and internationally in the Chinese Basketball Association with the Shandong Lions. Jones is a member of the Puerto Rican national basketball team since 2007.

Biography
Jones played his collegiate career at Sacramento State from 2001-2004 after transferring from Grossmont College.  Jones was All-Big Sky Conference in 2001-2002 and 2003-2004 seasons with the Sacramento State Hornets.

Jones has played professionally in the National Superior Basketball League of Puerto Rico since 2002 and in the Chinese Basketball Association during the 2005–2006 season.

In 2006 Jones was allocated to the Los Angeles D-Fenders of the NBDL.  He was waived at the conclusion of the NBDL Pre-Season on 22 November 2006.

Jones played in Germany for the BG Karlsruhe, and now he plays for the Quebradillas Pirates in Puerto Rico.  While participating in the Olympic Qualifying Tournament, Jones signed a contract with Ironi Ramat of the Ligat Winner league, but later announced that he will not come to Israel because of family problems.

International career
During summer of 2007, Jones represented Puerto Rico as a member of the Puerto Rican National Basketball Team during the 2007 Pan-American Games winning the Silver Medal. In 2008, Jones was included as a reserve player in the national team, officially joining the roster when two vacants were open.

Jones is not in the 2010 Puerto Rico national basketball team and won't be playing in the 2010 FIBA World Championship in Turkey.

Career stats
Jones's NCAA stats are 12.1 PPG, 4.2 RPG, 1.4 SPG, 0.8 BPG, .425 field goal percentage, .350 3-point percentage.

References

1981 births
Living people
American expatriate basketball people in Argentina
American expatriate basketball people in China
American expatriate basketball people in Germany
American men's basketball players
Atléticos de San Germán players
Baloncesto Superior Nacional players
BG Karlsruhe players
Boca Juniors basketball players
Capitanes de Arecibo players
Junior college men's basketball players in the United States
Leones de Ponce basketball players
Piratas de Quebradillas players
Puerto Rican men's basketball players
Puerto Rico men's national basketball team players
Sacramento State Hornets men's basketball players
Shandong Hi-Speed Kirin players
Shooting guards